Restrepia wageneri is a species of orchid endemic to northwestern Venezuela.

References

External links 

wageneri
Endemic orchids of Venezuela